Dateline Scotland is a Scottish satire of television current affairs programmes, broadcast in 2014, created by Jack Foster, James Devoy and Jonathan Cairney. Dateline Scotland is composed of eight 5-6 minute episodes and a 15-minute special, released to coincide with the Scottish independence referendum polling day. The eight 5 minute episodes were originally broadcast online, from 30 July to 17 September 2014 online.  A one-off special of the programme was also released in May 2015, to coincide with the UK general election.

In July 2018, the show's creators released 13 new programmes under a revived format titled Dateline 2018. The series focused less on Scottish politics than its predecessor, and also saw the departure of Briony Cruden, who played the correspondent Briony Laing.

Programme format

Each episode is presented as a parody news programme, anchored by Foster and Devoy, featuring 3-4 spoof stories based on the previous week's news.  Dateline Scotland was produced in the final 2 months of the 2014 Scottish independence referendum, and the programme's content is reflective of this.

It has been suggested that the show's popularity was related to a dissatisfaction amongst independence supporters with the mainstream Scottish media, with regards its coverage of the referendum.

Main characters

 Jack Foster (Jack Foster) – Anchor
 James Devoy (James Devoy) – Anchor
 Briony Laing (Briony Cruden) – Various correspondents
 George Deary (Jonathan Cairney) – Director of Strategy for the Better Together campaign (parody).

One-off correspondents who appeared in the Referendum Day Special, include Coletta Samson (Sandra O'Sullivan), Thomas Capes (Matthew Houlihan), Achiltibuie Correspondent (Dan Devoy). Political cartoonist Greg Moodie also guests as Leroy Jenkmans, “Chief Strategist for Yes Scotland” (Parody).

Cast and crew
Jack Foster – Anchor
James Devoy – Anchor
Jonathan Cairney – George Deary (also Seb Foucault and Piers Morgen)
Briony Laing – Various Correspondent roles
Devisers – Jack Foster and James Devoy
Writers - Jack Foster, James Devoy, Jonathan Cairney, the cast
Directors - Jack Foster and James Devoy
Producers - Jack Foster and James Devoy

References

External links

Official YouTube channel

Scottish humour
News parodies
Scottish satirical television shows
British mockumentary television series
Television series about television